"Yesterday, When I Was Mad" is a song by English synth-pop duo Pet Shop Boys, released as the fifth and final single from their fifth studio album, Very (1993), on 29 August 1994. The single peaked at number 13 on the UK Singles Chart and number four on the US Billboard Hot Dance Club Play chart. The song was remixed by Jam & Spoon for its single release, among other things removing a compression effect applied to Neil Tennant's voice during the verses. One of the B-sides is a cover of the Noël Coward song "If Love Were All".

Composition
The song is about the stresses of touring and how being away from loved ones can make musicians unwilling to trust others or carry on with their career, contrasting it with the humour of ironic, pretentious or rude things people say to touring musicians. Tennant has said that many of the lines in the song, such as 'And someone said, "It's fabulous you're still around today—you've both made such a little go a very long way!"' actually happened.

"Euroboy"
"Euroboy", a dance track written by Neil Tennant and Chris Lowe in the Eurodance mould of such bands as Cappella and Livin' Joy, was released as one of the B-sides on "Yesterday, When I Was Mad". It later appeared on the US release of the album Disco 2, the B-side collection Alternative and the 2001 2-disc re-release of Very.

The track includes Chris Lowe in one of his rare lead-vocals performances, singing through a vocoder.
The Boys claimed  to have been unaware at the time of release that Euroboy was also the name of a softcore gay pornographic magazine.

It was occasionally performed live on the Asian leg of the band's 1994 Discovery tour.

Critical reception
Alan Jones from Music Week gave the song three out of five, calling it "a bright tongue-in-cheek romp, but its galloping disco style makes few concessions to melody." Brad Beatnik from the RM Dance Update noted, "This duo seem to be getting more excited about dance mixes with each single they put out. This one, another idiosyncratic and charming pop song, has about eight mixes." Another editor, James Hamilton, declared it as a "hi-NRG galloper". Jonathan Bernstein from Spin viewed it as "a wry litany of faint praise with which the pair have been damned".

Music video
A music video was produced to promote the single. It was directed by Howard Greenhalgh, and as with his previous videos for the Very campaign, makes prominent use of computer graphics. Taking the song's theme of "madness" literally (insanity rather than anger), it features a straitjacket-clad Tennant trapped in a surreal psychiatric hospital, all the while being taunted by a tuxedo-wearing version of himself, who represents the critic in the song's lyrics. Saturated colours were added in to give the video a nightmarish, unsettling quality.

Track listings

 UK CD1
 "Yesterday, When I Was Mad" – 3:59
 "If Love Were All" – 2:58
 "Can You Forgive Her?" (swing version) – 4:53
 "Yesterday, When I Was Mad" (Jam & Spoon mix) – 9:20

 UK CD2
 "Yesterday, When I Was Mad" (Coconut 1 remix) – 4:05
 "Some Speculation" – 6:33
 "Yesterday, When I Was Mad" (Junior Vasquez Factory dub) – 8:19
 "Yesterday, When I Was Mad" (RAF Zone dub) – 5:37

 UK 12-inch single
A1. "Yesterday, When I Was Mad" (Jam & Spoon mix) – 9:20
B1. "Yesterday, When I Was Mad" (Junior Vasquez Factory dub) – 9:17
B2. "Yesterday, When I Was Mad" (RAF Zone dub) – 6:20

 UK cassette single and European CD single
 "Yesterday, When I Was Mad" – 3:59
 "Euroboy" – 4:28

 US maxi-CD single
 "Yesterday, When I Was Mad" (Jam & Spoon mix)
 "Yesterday, When I Was Mad" (Coconut 1 12-inch mix)
 "Yesterday, When I Was Mad" (Raf Zone mix)
 "Yesterday, When I Was Mad" (Junior Vasquez Fabulous dub)
 "Euroboy"
 "Some Speculation"

 US 2×12-inch single
A1. "Yesterday, When I Was Mad" (Jam & Spoon mix) – 9:20
B1. "Yesterday, When I Was Mad" (Junior Vasquez Factory dub) – 9:17
B2. "Yesterday, When I Was Mad" (Junior Vasquez Body dub) – 3:58
C1. "Yesterday, When I Was Mad" (Junior Vasquez Fabulous dub) – 8:19
C2. "Yesterday, When I Was Mad" (RAF Zone mix) – 6:39
D1. "Yesterday, When I Was Mad" (Coconut 1 12-inch mix) – 8:22
D2. "Euroboy" – 4:28

 Australian CD single
 "Yesterday, When I Was Mad"
 "If Love Were All" – 2:58
 "Can You Forgive Her?" (swing version) – 4:53
 "Yesterday, When I Was Mad" (Jam & Spoon mix) – 9:20
 "Absolutely Fabulous"

 Australian cassette single
 "Yesterday, When I Was Mad" – 3:59
 "Euroboy" – 4:28
 "Absolutely Fabulous"

Charts

References

1993 songs
1994 singles
Music videos directed by Howard Greenhalgh
Parlophone singles
Pet Shop Boys songs
Songs about the media
Songs written by Chris Lowe
Songs written by Neil Tennant